Dumitrache is a Romanian surname that may refer to
Cristiana Dumitrache (born 1956), Romanian astronomer
Florea Dumitrache (1948–2007), Romanian football forward 
Stadionul Florea Dumitrache, a multi-use stadium in Bucharest, Romania
Ioan Dumitrache (1889–1977), Romanian army general
Maria Magdalena Dumitrache (born 1977), Romanian rower 

Romanian-language surnames